HSwMS Bävern (Bä), (Swedish for "Beaver") was the fifth Hajen-class submarine of the Swedish Navy.

Construction and career 
HSwMS Bävern was launched on 3 February 1958 by Saab Kockums, Karlskrona and commissioned on 29 May 1959.

She was decommissioned on 1 July 1980 and later sold for scrap in Odense in 1981.

Gallery

References 

Hajen-class submarines
Ships built in Malmö
1958 ships